SS Lac La Belle was a wooden-hulled American package freighter in service between 1864 and 1872. She was built in 1864 in Cleveland, Ohio, by Ira Lafrinier for Hanna & Garretson, also of Cleveland. She had an identical sister ship named Ironsides. Lac La Belle operated between Cleveland and Lake Superior for a number of years, and was sold several times. In 1869, she was sold to Nathan Englemann of Milwaukee, Wisconsin, and operated between Milwaukee and Grand Haven, Michigan. In 1871, she became part of the Englemann Transportation Company. Throughout her career, Lac La Belle was involved in several accidents.

On the night of October 13, 1872, Lac La Belle left Milwaukee for Grand Haven under the command of Captain W. H. Thompson, with about 19,000 bushels of barley, 1,200 barrels of flour, 50 barrels of pork, 25 barrels of whiskey, 20 tons of animal feed, sundries and 53 passengers and crew on board. There was a gale blowing across Lake Michigan. At around midnight, the rising water in Lac La Belles engine room extinguished the fire in her boilers. All attempts to save her failed. Next morning, the passengers and crew began abandoning Lac La Belle. One of the lifeboats capsized, resulting in the deaths of eight people.

As of 2021, the wreck of Lac La Belle has not been located.

History

Design and construction
Lac La Belle (US official number15803) was built in 1864 in Cleveland, Ohio, by Ira Lafrinnier. She was launched on April 30, 1864, and had an identical sister ship named Ironsides, built by either Lafrinnier, or Quayle & Martin.

She had a gross tonnage of 872.5 tons.

Steam for the engine was provided by two firebox boilers. Lac La Belles engine and boilers were both built by the Cuyahoga Steam Furnace Company of Cleveland. She was propelled by two fixed-pitch propellers. She was either the first, or one of the first propeller driven steamships on the Great Lakes with twin funnels.

Service history
Lac La Belle was commissioned by Robert Hanna & Company of Cleveland, and operated between Cleveland and various Lake Superior ports. On July 8, 1864, she was enrolled in Cleveland, which was also her home port. Later, her home port was changed to Milwaukee, Wisconsin. Throughout her career, Lac La Belle was involved in multiple accidents.

She ran aground at Eagle River, Michigan in 1864. After the old measurement system was abolished, Lac La Belle was remeasured in Cleveland on July 20, 1865. In that same year, she ran aground while upbound on Lake Superior, sustaining $5,000 (equivalent to $ in ) worth of damage. Lac La Belle sustained $400 (equivalent to $ in ) worth of damage in September 1866, when one of her propellers broke on Lake Superior.

On November 23, 1866, Lac La Belle was downbound from Ontonagon, Michigan, for Cleveland with a cargo of 385 tons of iron ore, 125 tons of copper ingots, potatoes, cedar posts, about 210 kegs of fish and ship's knees. Lac La Belle was travelling along the American shore of the St. Clair River. After rounding the bend in the river, Lac La Belle blew her whistle once, signaling to Milwaukee that she should head along the Canadian shore of the river. Lac La Belle turned to port, in order to head closer to the shore. The force of the collision was so great that for a time, Milwaukee was unable to free herself from the gash. Lac La Belle sank into  of water in less than five minutes. Two crewmen from Lac La Belle died. Chief engineer James Evans drowned in the engine room, while steward Henry Rudd was crushed after falling between the two vessels as he was trying to jump over to Milwaukees deck.

It was reported at the time that "a general unfamiliarity with the St. Clair River by one, if not both pilots probably contributed to the crash". On June 15, 1871, the Detroit Free Press reported that:

On Tuesday nearly five years from the date of the collision, the suit which resulted between the vessels was decided in the United States District Court by Judge Longyear. Assessment of the damage being abrogated and thus both vessels having been at fault. The night was light and the vessels saw each other many hundred feet away. To a landsman it seems a wonder that a collision should ensue under such circumstances, but to a navigator aware of the difficulties in determining the speed at which vessels are approaching, the uncertainty which often attends signals, and the confusion and panic which are apt to prevail when there becomes danger of a collision, the occurrence of these accidents seem less surprising. In the one in question, the officers of both boats undoubtedly believed they did their whole duty and held themselves blameless.

Operations to raise the wreck of Lac La Belle began on July 23, 1869, and were undertaken by the Coast Wrecking Company of New York City. After she was raised, she was taken to Detroit for repairs, which cost $14,000 (equivalent to $ in ). On September 24, Nathan Englemann of Milwaukee purchased her at an auction in Detroit for $23,600 (equivalent to $ in ). Under Englemann's ownership, she operated between Milwaukee and Grand Haven, Michigan, in conjunction with the Detroit, Grand Haven & Milwaukee Railway.

In November 1869, Lac La Belle ran aground in Grand Traverse Bay. On December 28, 1870, she became part of the Englemann Transportation Company of Milwaukee. The following year on July 4, Lac La Belle missed the Grand Haven harbour entrance and ran aground. After almost six hours, she was freed.

Final voyage
At 9:00 or 9:30p.m. on October 13, 1872, Lac La Belle left Milwaukee for Grand Haven under the command of Captain W. H. Thompson, with about 19,000 bushels of barley, 1,200 barrels of flour, 50 barrels of pork, 25 barrels of whiskey, 20 tons of animal feed, sundries and 53 passengers and crew on board. There was a gale blowing across Lake Michigan. At around midnight, the rising water in Lac La Belles engine room extinguished the fire in her boilers. All attempts to save her failed. At around 5:00a.m., the passengers and crew began abandoning Lac La Belle. One of the lifeboats capsized, resulting in the deaths of eight people, while the rest of the lifeboats drifted ashore, or were picked up by passing vessels.

Ironsides sank under similar circumstances, eleven months later along the same route. As of 2021, the wreck of Lac La Belle has not been located.

References

Sources

 
 
 
 
 
 
 
 
 
 
 
 
 
 
 
 
 

1864 ships
Great Lakes freighters
Ships built in Cleveland
Maritime incidents in June 1864
Maritime incidents in 1865
Maritime incidents in 1866
Maritime incidents in 1869
Maritime incidents in 1870
Maritime incidents in October 1872
Shipwrecks of Lake Michigan
Shipwrecks of the Wisconsin coast
Missing ships
Package freighters
Ships sunk in storms